"Fela In Versace" is a single by South African rapper AKA from his third studio album Touch My Blood. It features Nigerian record producer Kiddominant and it was released July 27, 2018 by Beam Group. The song was certified platinum by RISA.

Critical reception
The song was received well by the public and became AKA's hit single to be included on Global Spotify Playlist, It also has spent five consecutive weeks at No.1 on the Metro FM Top 40 Chart including on Ukhozi FM Top 40 Chart.

Music video
The music video for "Fela In Versace" was shot in Downtown, Johannesburg with several revealed landmark and was directed by Nate Thomas. The music video of the song was released on AKA's VEVO account on September 12, 2018. Since it was released has surpassed over 3 000 000 views.

References 

2018 songs
2018 singles
AKA (rapper) songs
Song recordings produced by Kiddominant